A compound Poisson process is a continuous-time (random) stochastic process with jumps. The jumps arrive randomly according to a Poisson process and the size of the jumps is also random, with a specified probability distribution. A compound Poisson process, parameterised by a rate  and jump size distribution G, is a process  given by

When  are non-negative integer-valued random variables, then this compound Poisson process is known as a stuttering Poisson process.

Properties of the compound Poisson process
The expected value of a compound Poisson process can be calculated using a result known as Wald's equation as:

Making similar use of the law of total variance, the variance can be calculated as: 

Lastly, using the law of total probability, the moment generating function can be given as follows:

Exponentiation of measures
Let N, Y, and D be as above.  Let μ be the probability measure according to which D is distributed, i.e.

Let δ0 be the trivial probability distribution putting all of the mass at zero.  Then the probability distribution of Y(t) is the measure

where the exponential exp(ν) of a finite measure ν on Borel subsets of the real line is defined by

and

is a convolution of measures, and the series converges weakly.

See also
 Poisson process
 Poisson distribution
 Compound Poisson distribution
 Non-homogeneous Poisson process
 Campbell's formula for the moment generating function of a compound Poisson process

Poisson point processes
Lévy processes

de:Poisson-Prozess#Zusammengesetzte Poisson-Prozesse